1052 Belgica, provisional designation , is a binary Florian asteroid from the inner regions of the asteroid belt, approximately 10 kilometers in diameter. It was discovered on 15 November 1925, by Belgian astronomer Eugène Delporte at Uccle Observatory in Belgium. It was the first minor planet discovered at Uccle Observatory, after which the minor planet 1276 Ucclia was named.

1052 is named after the Western European state of Belgium.

Classification and orbit 

Belgica is a member of the Flora family, one of the largest groups of stony asteroids in the main-belt. It orbits the Sun at a distance of 1.9–2.6 AU once every 3 years and 4 months (1,222 days). Its orbit has an eccentricity of 0.14 and an inclination of 5° with respect to the ecliptic. The body's observation arc begins with its first used observation taken at Uccle/Bergedorf in 1933, or 8 years after its official discovery at Uccle.

Physical characteristics 

In both the Tholen and SMASS taxonomy, Belgica is classified as a common stony S-type asteroid.

Rotation period 

Between December 2012, and January 2013, photometric observations of Belgica were taken at several observatories in Italy, the Czech Republic, Spain and the United States by astronomers Luis Martinez, Lorenzo Franco, Andrea Ferrero, Petr Pravec, and Stefano Padovan. They gave three concurring lightcurves with a rotation period of 2.709 hours and a brightness variation of 0.08 to 0.10 magnitude, indicating a nearly spheroidal shape for the asteroid's body.

Satellite 

The photometric observations also revealed, that Belgica is a binary system with an asteroid moon, approximately 36% the diameter of its primary, orbiting it every  hours. Johnston's archive derives a diameter of 3.53 kilometers and estimates a semi-major axis of 34 kilometer for the moon.

Diameter and albedo 

According to the survey carried out by NASA's Wide-field Infrared Survey Explorer with its subsequent NEOWISE mission, Belgica measures 9.78 and 10.406 kilometers in diameter and its surface has an albedo of 0.301 and 0.273, respectively, while the Collaborative Asteroid Lightcurve Link assumes a standard albedo for stony asteroids of 0.20 and derives a diameter of 10.94 kilometers with an absolute magnitude of 12.17. This agrees with the estimated diameter of  kilometers by Franco et al.

Naming 

This minor planet was named in honor of the state of Belgium. The name "Belgica" was suggested during the height of World War I by American astronomer Joel Hastings Metcalf, but the Director of the German Astronomisches Rechen-Institut in Berlin, Fritz Cohn, rejected the proposal based on political considerations, as Belgium was occupied by German troops at the time.

In his Dictionary of Minor Planets Names, astronomer Lutz Schmadel described this piece of history involving minor planet names in detail. Naming citation was first mentioned in The Names of the Minor Planets by Paul Herget in 1955.

References

External links 
 Asteroids with Satellites, Robert Johnston, johnstonsarchive.net
 Asteroid Lightcurve Database (LCDB), query form (info )
 Dictionary of Minor Planet Names, Google books
 Asteroids and comets rotation curves, CdR – Observatoire de Genève, Raoul Behrend
 Discovery Circumstances: Numbered Minor Planets (1)-(5000)  – Minor Planet Center
 
 

001052
Discoveries by Eugène Joseph Delporte
Named minor planets
001052
001052
001052
19251115